This is a list of 198 species in Prepops, a genus of plant bugs in the family Miridae.

Prepops species

 Prepops accinctus (Distant, 1893) c g
 Prepops adluteiceps Carvalho, 1988 c g
 Prepops albomarginatus (Reuter, 1910) c g
 Prepops alienus (Reuter, 1910) c g
 Prepops anasueliae Carvalho and Fontes, 1970 c g
 Prepops areatus (Reuter, 1910) c g
 Prepops atratus (Distant, 1883) c g
 Prepops atripennis (Reuter, 1876) i c g
 Prepops atroluteus (Walker, 1873) c g
 Prepops bachmanni Carvalho and Carpintero, 1990 c g
 Prepops bahiensis Carvalho, 1975 c g
 Prepops banosus Carvalho, 1988 c g
 Prepops barueriensis Carvalho, 1988 c g
 Prepops bastensis Carvalho and Costa, 1991 c g
 Prepops bechynei Carvalho, 1988 c g
 Prepops beniensis Carvalho, 1988 c g
 Prepops bicolor (Distant, 1883) c
 Prepops bicoloroides Carvalho and Schaffner, 1987 c g
 Prepops bivittatus (Stål, 1860) c g
 Prepops bivittis (Stål, 1862) i c g b
 Prepops bolivianus Carvalho and Fontes, 1969 c g
 Prepops borealis (Knight, 1923) i c g b
 Prepops caatinganus Carvalho, 1988 c g
 Prepops cajuruensis Carvalho and Costa, 1991 c g
 Prepops caliensis Carvalho, 1989 c g
 Prepops candelariensis Hernandez and Henry, 2010 c g
 Prepops canelae Carvalho and Fontes, 1970 c g
 Prepops caracensis Carvalho, 1974 c g
 Prepops carioca Carvalho and Fontes, 1970 c g
 Prepops casualis Carvalho, 1988 c g
 Prepops catamarcanus Carvalho, 1988 c g
 Prepops catarinensis Carvalho and Fontes, 1970 c g
 Prepops championi (Carvalho, 1952) c g
 Prepops chanchamaianus Carvalho, 1988 c g
 Prepops circumcinctus (Say, 1832) i c g b
 Prepops circummaculatus (Stål, 1854) c g
 Prepops columbiensis (Carvalho and Fontes, 1972) c g
 Prepops comarapanus Carvalho, 1988 c g
 Prepops commissuralis (Reuter, 1910) c g
 Prepops concinnoides Carvalho, 1988 c g
 Prepops concinnus (Stål, 1860) c g
 Prepops concisus (Knight, 1929) i c g
 Prepops confraternus (Uhler, 1872) i c g
 Prepops cordobanus Carvalho and Fontes, 1969 c g
 Prepops correntinoides Carvalho and Carpintero, 1987 c g
 Prepops costalis (Stål, 1860) c g
 Prepops crassicornis (Reuter, 1910) c g
 Prepops cruciferoides Carvalho and Fontes, 1970 c g
 Prepops crucifera (Berg, 1879) i c g
 Prepops cruxnigra (Reuter, 1910) c g
 Prepops cubanus Carvalho and Schaffner, 1974 c g
 Prepops cuzcoensis Carvalho, 1988 c g
 Prepops decoratus (Reuter, 1910) c g
 Prepops diamantinensis Carvalho, 1984 c g
 Prepops diminutus Carvalho and Fontes, 1973 i c g
 Prepops dissociatus (Berg, 1892) c g
 Prepops divisus (Herrich-Schaeffer, 1850) i c g
 Prepops englemani Carvalho and Schaffner, 1987 c g
 Prepops entrerianus Carvalho and Carpintero, 1987 c g
 Prepops eremicola (Knight, 1929) i c g
 Prepops erubescens (Distant, 1883) c g
 Prepops falloui (Bergroth, 1898) c g
 Prepops fernandopolis Carvalho, 1988 c g
 Prepops fiuzai Carvalho and Fontes, 1973 c g
 Prepops flavicostus (Berg, 1884) c g
 Prepops flavoniger (Stål, 1860) c g
 Prepops flavovarius (Reuter, 1910) c g
 Prepops fragosoi Carvalho, 1988 c g
 Prepops fraterculus (Knight, 1923) i c g
 Prepops fraternus (Knight, 1923) i c g b
 Prepops frontalis (Reuter, 1905) i c g
 Prepops goianus Carvalho and Costa, 1992 c g
 Prepops gracilis (Reuter, 1910) c g
 Prepops guanduensis Carvalho and Costa, 1991 c g
 Prepops guaranianus Carvalho and Fontes, 1970 c g
 Prepops guttaticeps (Reuter, 1910) c g
 Prepops hambletoni Carvalho, 1988 c g
 Prepops hogbergi (Stål, 1862) c g
 Prepops horvathi (Reuter, 1910) c g
 Prepops howardi (Reuter, 1910) c g
 Prepops huanucanus Carvalho, 1974 c g
 Prepops huascaraiensis Carvalho, 1988 c g
 Prepops iconnicoffi (Reuter, 1910) c g
 Prepops iguazuensis Carvalho and Carpintero, 1987 c g
 Prepops imperatrizensis Carvalho and Costa, 1991 c g
 Prepops insignis (Say, 1832) i c g
 Prepops insitivoides Carvalho and Fontes, 1969 c g
 Prepops insitivus (Say, 1832) i c g b
 Prepops interpunctus (Distant, 1883) c g
 Prepops itatiaiensis Carvalho and Fontes, 1968 c g
 Prepops jamaicensis (Walker, 1873) c g
 Prepops koschevnikovi (Reuter, 1910) c g
 Prepops latipennis (Stål, 1862) c g
 Prepops liliae Carvalho, 1988 c g
 Prepops limbicollis (Reuter, 1910) c g
 Prepops lineatus Carvalho, 1975 c g
 Prepops lopesi Carvalho and Fontes, 1973 c g
 Prepops luteiceps (Stal, 1859) c g
 Prepops luteofasciatus (Distant, 1883) c g
 Prepops maldonadoi Carvalho and Fontes, 1973 c g
 Prepops malkini Carvalho, 1988 c g
 Prepops marginalis (Reuter, 1910) c g
 Prepops mariliensis Carvalho and Costa, 1991 c g
 Prepops meinerti (Reuter, 1905) c g
 Prepops mielkei Carvalho, 1988 c g
 Prepops mimosus Carvalho and Fontes, 1970 c g
 Prepops minensis Carvalho and Fontes, 1970 c g
 Prepops minutulus (Reuter, 1910) c g
 Prepops missionesus Carvalho, 1988 c g
 Prepops montevidensis (Berg, 1883) c g
 Prepops montivagus (Distant, 1883) c g
 Prepops nicaraguensis Carvalho and Schaffner, 1987 c g
 Prepops nigricollis (Reuter, 1876) i c g
 Prepops nigripennis (Stål, 1860) c g
 Prepops nigripilus (Knight, 1929) i c g b
 Prepops nigritus Carvalho, 1988 c g
 Prepops nigroscutellatus (Knight, 1923) i c g
 Prepops nigrus Carvalho and Fontes, 1970 c g
 Prepops nitidipennis (Reuter, 1910) c g
 Prepops nobilis (Reuter, 1910) c g
 Prepops notaticollis (Reuter, 1910) c g
 Prepops nuevoleonensis Carvalho and Schaffner, 1987 c g
 Prepops oaxacaenus Carvalho and Schaffner, 1974 c g
 Prepops obscurans (Distant, 1883) c g
 Prepops olmosensis Carvalho, 1988 c g
 Prepops omphalophorus (Reuter, 1910) c g
 Prepops palatanganus Carvalho, 1988 c g
 Prepops paraensis Carvalho and Fontes, 1971 c g
 Prepops paraguaiensis Carvalho and Fontes, 1970 c g
 Prepops paranaensis Carvalho and Fontes, 1969 c g
 Prepops patricius (Reuter, 1910) c g
 Prepops paulistanus Carvalho and Fontes, 1970 c g
 Prepops pauloi Carvalho, 1988 c g
 Prepops pentheri (Reuter, 1907) c g
 Prepops persignandus (Distant, 1883) i c g
 Prepops persimilis (Reuter, 1907) c g
 Prepops peruvianus (Reuter, 1910) c g
 Prepops piraporanus Carvalho, 1988 c g
 Prepops platensis (Berg, 1878) c g
 Prepops plaumann Carvalho, 1989 c g
 Prepops plenus (Distant, 1883) c g
 Prepops poppii (Bergroth, 1910) c g
 Prepops prepopsoides Carvalho, 1974 c g
 Prepops procorrentinus Carvalho and Carpintero, 1992 c g
 Prepops quadriguttatus Carvalho and Fontes, 1970 c g
 Prepops riodocensis Carvalho, 1988 c g
 Prepops robustus (Reuter, 1913) i
 Prepops rollei (Reuter, 1910) c g
 Prepops rondoniensis Carvalho, 1988 c g
 Prepops roppai Carvalho, 1974 c g
 Prepops rubellicollis (Knight, 1923) i c g
 Prepops rubroscutellatus (Knight, 1929) i c g b
 Prepops rubrovittatus (Stål, 1862) i c g b
 Prepops rufocapitis Carvalho and Fontes, 1971 c g
 Prepops rurrenabaquensis Carvalho and Costa, 1991 c g
 Prepops saltensis Carvalho and Fontes, 1970 c g
 Prepops santiagoensis Hernandez and Henry, 2010 c g
 Prepops schaffneri Carvalho and Fontes, 1973 c g
 Prepops semifemoratus Carvalho and Costa, 1992 c g
 Prepops seminiger (Stål, 1860) c g
 Prepops serranus Carvalho and Fontes, 1969 c g
 Prepops setosipes (Reuter, 1910) c g
 Prepops signifer (Reuter, 1910) c g
 Prepops similaris Carvalho and Fontes, 1973 c g
 Prepops simplex (Kuhlgatz, 1902) c g
 Prepops stricturalis (Reuter, 1910) c g
 Prepops subandinus Carvalho and Wallerstein, 1978 c g
 Prepops subannulatus (Stål, 1860) c g
 Prepops subsimilis (Reuter, 1907) c g
 Prepops teapensis (Distant, 1893) c g
 Prepops teutonianus Carvalho and Fontes, 1969 c g
 Prepops teutoniensis Carvalho, 1993 c g
 Prepops thoracicus (Distant, 1883) c g
 Prepops tingoensis Carvalho, 1988 c g
 Prepops tiquiensis Carvalho, 1988 c g
 Prepops trilineatus Carvalho and Fontes, 1970 c g
 Prepops tristicolor (Reuter, 1910) c g
 Prepops trivittatus Carvalho and Fontes, 1969 c g
 Prepops trujilloi (Distant, 1893) c g
 Prepops tucumanensis Carvalho and Fontes, 1969 c g
 Prepops tupianus Carvalho and Fontes, 1970 c g
 Prepops turrialbanus Carvalho and Schaffner, 1974 c g
 Prepops ubirajarai Carvalho, 1989 c g
 Prepops univittatoides Carvalho and Fontes, 1970 c g
 Prepops univittatus (Berg, 1878) c g
 Prepops uruguayensis (Berg, 1883) c g
 Prepops variabilis Carvalho and Fontes, 1970 c g
 Prepops vianai Carvalho and Fontes, 1970 c g
 Prepops vissosensis Carvalho, 1988 c g
 Prepops vittatus Carvalho and Schaffner, 1987 c g
 Prepops vitticollis (Reuter, 1910) c g
 Prepops vittifrons (Stål, 1862) c g
 Prepops wallersteini Carvalho and Fontes, 1970 c g
 Prepops wanderbilti Carvalho, 1988 c g
 Prepops xavantinoides Carvalho and Fontes, 1972 c g
 Prepops xavantinus Carvalho and Fontes, 1969 c g
 Prepops zetterstedti (Stål, 1860) c g
 Prepops zonatus (Knight, 1926) i c g

Data sources: i = ITIS, c = Catalogue of Life, g = GBIF, b = Bugguide.net

References

Prepops